Field hockey at the 1980 Summer Olympics in Moscow took place from July 20 to 31, 1980 at the Minor Arena of the Central Dynamo Stadium and the Young Pioneers Stadium. India won the men's tournament for the record eighth time, defeating Spain 4–3 in the final. The women's tournament was won by Zimbabwe.

The 33 matches of hockey events across the two venues were watched by 177,880 spectators.

Competition schedule

Medal summary

Medal table

Men's medal winners

Women's medal winners

References

Sources

Citations

 
Field hockey at the Summer Olympics
1980 Summer Olympics events
1980 in field hockey
1980 Summer Olympics